Barmacheh may refer to:
 Barmacheh-ye Bala Mahal
 Barmacheh-ye Pain Mahal